The 2023 SANFL Women's League season is the seventh season of the SANFL Women's League (SANFLW). The season commenced on 17 February and will conclude with the Grand Final on 11 June. The competition is contested by eight clubs, all of whom are affiliated with clubs from the men's South Australian National Football League (SANFL).

Clubs

Ladder

Finals series

First semi-final

Second semi-final

Preliminary final

Grand Final

Awards
SANFL Women's Best and Fairest
 TBC – TBC votes (TBC)
Coaches Award
 TBC – TBC votes (TBC)
Leading Goal Kicker Award
 TBC – TBC goals (TBC)
Leadership Award
 TBC (TBC)
Development League Premiers
 TBC (TBC)

References

SANFL Women's League
SANFLW